William Robert Kells is a New Zealand former rugby league footballer, and coach who represented New Zealand.

Playing career
From the Huntly area, Kells was a Waikato representative and was selected in the New Zealand national rugby league team squad in 1980. Kells spent the 1982/83 season with Bradford Northern in England.

Coaching career
In 1997 and 1998 Kells coached Waikato. Waikato won the 1997 National Provincial Competition.

He coached Northern Districts in 2001 against France. In 2003 Kells was the co-coach of the Ngaruawahia Panthers in the Waikato Rugby League.

References

Living people
Bradford Bulls players
New Zealand national rugby league team players
New Zealand rugby league coaches
New Zealand rugby league players
Ngaruawahia Panthers players
Northern Districts rugby league team players
Rugby league five-eighths
Rugby league players from Huntly, New Zealand
Waikato rugby league team coaches
Waikato rugby league team players
Year of birth missing (living people)